The Andorran Sailing Federation is the national governing body for the sport of sailing in Andorra, recognised by the International Sailing Federation.

References

External links
 Official website

Andorra
Sailing
1988 establishments in Andorra
Sports organizations established in 1988
Sailing in Andorra